Joseph ben Samuel ha-Mashbir (– 13 January 1700) was a Karaite ḥakham and theologian. He was born in Derazhnia, Volhynia, and moved to Halicz, Galicia in about 1670.

He was the author of Porat Yosef, on Hebrew grammar; Sheber Yosef, on religious philosophy; Birke Yosef, the subject of which is not known; a commentary on the ten Karaite articles of faith; and Ner Ḥokhmah or Perush Seder ha-Tefillah, a commentary on the prayer-book. The last-named work remained unfinished at the time of the death of the author. Joseph also composed numerous liturgical poems, which were incorporated in the Karaite prayer-book.

A funeral oration was pronounced over him by Mordecai ben Nissan, who had consulted him on the answer he was to give to  about the origin of Karaism.

Notes

References
 

1700 deaths
Karaite rabbis
Hebrew-language poets
People from Halych
Rabbis from Galicia (Eastern Europe)